Choi Chul-won  (born 23 July 1979) is a South Korean footballer who plays as a goalkeeper for FC Seoul in the K League 1.

Club career
In 2016, Choi Chul-won joined Bucheon FC 1995 and Choi made K League 2 debut against Daejeon Hana Citizen on 19 September 2016.

In 2020 Choi Chul-won joined Sangju Sangmu on military service. In June 2021, he was discharged and returned Bucheon FC 1995.

In 2022 K League 2 season, he gave a well-received performance and his good performance attracted attention of K League 1 clubs.

On 28 December 2022, Choi Chul-won signed a contract with K League 1 side FC Seoul.

References

External links 

1994 births
Living people
Association football goalkeepers
South Korean footballers
Bucheon FC 1995 players
FC Seoul players
K League 1 players
K League 2 players
Gwangju University alumni